Purulia is a city and a municipality in the Indian state of West Bengal. It is the headquarters of the Purulia district. It is located on the north of the Kangsabati River.

Geography

Location
It has an average elevation of 228 metres (748 feet).

Area overview
Purulia district forms the lowest step of the Chota Nagpur Plateau. The general scenario is undulating land with scattered hills. Purulia Sadar subdivision covers the central portion of the district. 83.80% of the population of the subdivision lives in rural areas. The map alongside shows some urbanization around Purulia city. 18.58% of the population, the highest among the subdivisions of the district, lives in urban areas. There are 4 census towns in the subdivision. The Kangsabati (locally called Kansai) flows through the subdivision. The subdivision has old temples, some of them belonging to the 11th century or earlier. The focus is on education - the university, the sainik school, the Ramakrishna Mission Vidyapith at Bongabari, the upcoming medical college at Hatuara, et al.

The area is served by the Purulia Junction railway station.

Note: The map alongside presents some of the notable locations in the subdivision. All places marked in the map are linked in the larger full screen map.

Climate
Summers are hot and dry with temperatures ranging from lows of 23 °C to highs above 38 °C. Winters are dry and cool with daily temperatures ranging from 12 °C to 26 °C. Most of the rainfall occurs during the wet monsoons.

Civic administration

Police stations
Purulia (Town) police station has jurisdiction over Purulia municipality and parts of Purulia I  and Purulia II CD Blocks. The area covered is 13.9 km2 and the population covered is 151,210.
	
Purulia (Muffasil) police station has jurisdiction over parts of Purulia I  and Purulia II CD Blocks. The area covered is 434.57 km2 and the population covered is 235,853.

Purulia Sadar Women police station was opened in 2014 at Bhatbandh, As of 2016, it is covering the jurisdiction of Purulia (T) PS, Purulia (M) PS, Kotshila PS, Arsha PS, Jhalda PS and Joypur PS.

Education

University
Sidho Kanho Birsha University

Degree colleges
Raghunathpur College
Achhruram Memorial College
Bikramjit Goswami Memorial College
Balarampur College
J.K. College, Purulia
Kashipur Michael Madhusudhan Mahavidyalaya
Nistarini Women's College

Engineering colleges
Ramkrishna Mahato Government Engineering College

Medical colleges
Purulia Government Medical College and Hospital
Purulia Homoeopathic Medical College & Hospital

Polytechnic colleges
Purulia Polytechnic

Schools
JAWAHAR NAVODAYA VIDYALAYA PURULIA
Sainik School, Purulia
Purulia Zilla School
DSK DAV Public School
The Assembly of God Church School
G.R.K. D.A.V. Public School
 Purulia M.M. High School
Ramakrishna Mission Vidyapith

People from Purulia
Gambhir Singh Mura

Purulia arms drop

On 18 December 1995, a mysterious weapon consignment was dropped from the sky over Joypur Jhalda area under Purulia district of West Bengal. The consignment was discovered the next morning. The reasons are still unknown.

References

External links

 
Cities and towns in Purulia district
Cities in West Bengal